Tarentel may refer to:

 Tarantella, a traditional Italian dance
 Tarentel (band), an American post-rock group